Sole and the Skyrider Band is the first studio album by Sole and the Skyrider Band. It was released on Anticon on October 23, 2007.

Critical reception

Johnny Langlands of The Skinny gave the album 4 stars out of 5, commenting that "this particular collaboration may be the proverbial slow burner, but trust that the rewards start unfurling by the third listen." Anthony Tognazzini of AllMusic wrote, "Muscular and textural, the Skyrider band supplanted Sole's previously digital soundscapes with an organic sound, lending the perfect backdrop to his complex flows and nimble wordplay." Grayson Haver Currin of Pitchfork gave the album a 6.8 out of 10, calling it Sole's "most consistently engaging album to date."

Track listing

Personnel
Credits adapted from liner notes.

Sole and the Skyrider Band
 Tim Holland – vocals, lyrics
 Bud Berning – guitar, bass guitar, double bass, synthesizer, sampler, drum programming, production, arrangement, mixing
 William Ryan Fritch – guitar, bass guitar, mandolin, violin, cello, saxophone, clarinet, flute, glockenspiel, vibraphone, keyboards, synthesizer
 John Wagner – drums, percussion

Technical personnel
 Alias – mixing
 Doug Krebs – mastering
 Ravi Zupa – artwork, logo
 Sam Flax Keener – layout

References

External links
 

2007 debut albums
Anticon albums
Sole and the Skyrider Band albums